Vincent Enrique Hinostroza (born April 3, 1994) is an American professional ice hockey forward who currently plays for the  Buffalo Sabres of the National Hockey League (NHL). Hinostroza was selected by the Chicago Blackhawks in the sixth round (169th overall) of the 2012 NHL Entry Draft.

Playing career
Hinostroza played for the Chicago Mission AAA Youth Hockey Club (where his future NHL teammates Ryan Hartman and Nick Schmaltz also played). While playing for the Mission's U16 midget team, he played in 34 games where he scored 13 goals, had 21 assists and 38 penalty minutes. He attended USA Hockey's Central District U16 camp and was selected by the Waterloo Black Hawks in the first round (4th overall) in the 2010 USHL Futures Draft. Hinostroza would later commit to playing college hockey at the University of Notre Dame.

Hinostroza attended the University of Notre Dame where he skated two seasons with the Notre Dame Fighting Irish. In his freshman season, he was named to the 2013–14 Hockey East All-Rookie Team, and the following year, he was named to the 2014–15 Hockey East First All-Star Team. On March 21, 2015, Hinostroza signalled the end of his collegiate career after his junior season in signing a three-year entry-level contract with the Chicago Blackhawks.

He was assigned to the Blackhawks AHL affiliate, the Rockford IceHogs to begin his professional rookie 2015–16 season. On October 16, 2015, he was recalled by the Blackhawks and on October 17, 2015, Hinostroza made his NHL debut, playing against the Columbus Blue Jackets. He recorded two penalty minutes and two shots on goal as Chicago won 4–1. Hinostroza scored his first career NHL goal against Jacob Markström of the Vancouver Canucks on November 19, 2016. He also recorded two assists in the same game which helped the Blackhawks rally from a 3–0 deficit and win in overtime. On June 15, 2018, Hinostroza agreed to a two-year contract with the Blackhawks, despite the possibility of becoming a free agent on July 1.

On July 12, 2018, Hinostroza was traded to the Arizona Coyotes along with Marián Hossa, Jordan Oesterle and a 2019 third-round pick, in exchange for Marcus Krüger, Jordan Maletta, Andrew Campbell, prospect MacKenzie Entwistle, and a 2019 fifth-round draft pick. This trade cleared up $8.5 million cap space for the Blackhawks.

On October 8, 2020, as an impending restricted free agent, Hinostroza was not tendered a qualifying offer by the Coyotes, releasing him to free agency. On October 9, at the opening of the free agent Market,  Hinostroza was signed to a one-year, $1 million contract with Florida Panthers.

On April 2, 2021, Hinostroza was traded back to the Chicago Blackhawks in exchange for Brad Morrison. After failing to record any points in nine games for Florida, Hinostroza tallied four goals and eight assists in 14 games with Chicago. 

Hinostroza was not offered a contract by the Blackhawks before NHL free agency began July 28, 2021, and was later signed to a one-year, $1.05 million deal with the Buffalo Sabres.

Personal life
Hinostroza is the son of Rick and Laura Hinostroza and he grew up in Illinois with his older sister Carli. He attended high school at Bartlett High School where he played lacrosse. While playing junior hockey with the Waterloo Blackhawks, he attended Waterloo West High School in Waterloo, Iowa where he graduated in 2012. His paternal grandparents were from Ecuador.

Career statistics

Regular season and playoffs

International

Awards and honors

References

External links
 

1994 births
American men's ice hockey left wingers
American people of Ecuadorian descent
Arizona Coyotes players
Buffalo Sabres players
Chicago Blackhawks draft picks
Chicago Blackhawks players
Florida Panthers players
Ice hockey people from Chicago
Living people
Notre Dame Fighting Irish men's ice hockey players
People from Bartlett, Illinois
Rochester Americans players
Rockford IceHogs (AHL) players
Sportspeople of Ecuadorian descent
Waterloo Black Hawks players